Progeria is a specific type of progeroid syndrome, also known as Hutchinson–Gilford syndrome. A single gene mutation is responsible for progeria. The gene, known as lamin A (LMNA), makes a protein  necessary for holding the nucleus of the cell together. When this gene gets mutated an abnormal form of lamin A protein called progerin is produced. Progeroid syndromes are a group of diseases that causes individuals to age faster than usual, leading to them appearing older than they actually are. Patients born with progeria typically live to an age of mid-teens to early twenties.

Severe cardiovascular complications usually develop by puberty, resulting in death.

Signs and symptoms
Children with progeria usually develop the first symptoms during their first few months of life. The earliest symptoms may include a failure to thrive and a localized scleroderma-like skin condition. As a child ages past infancy, additional conditions become apparent, usually around 18–24 months. Limited growth, full-body alopecia (hair loss), and a distinctive appearance (a small face with a shallow, recessed jaw and a pinched nose) are all characteristics of progeria. Signs and symptoms of this progressive disease tend to become more marked as the child ages. Later, the condition causes wrinkled skin, kidney failure, loss of eyesight, and atherosclerosis and other cardiovascular problems. Scleroderma, a hardening and tightening of the skin on trunk and extremities of the body, is prevalent. People diagnosed with this disorder usually have small, fragile bodies, like those of older adults. The head is usually large to the body, with a narrow, wrinkled face and a beak nose. Prominent scalp veins are noticeable (made more obvious by alopecia), as well as prominent eyes. Musculoskeletal degeneration causes loss of body fat and muscle, stiff joints, hip dislocations, and other symptoms generally absent in the non-elderly population. Individuals usually retain typical mental and motor princess.

Pathophysiology
Hutchinson-Gilford syndrome (HGPS) is an extremely rare autosomal dominant genetic disorder in which symptoms resembling aspects of aging are manifested at an early age. Its occurrence is usually the result of a sporadic germline mutation; although HGPS is genetically dominant, people rarely live long enough to have children, preventing them from passing the disorder on in a hereditary manner.

HPGS is caused by mutations that weaken the structure of the cell nucleus, making normal cell division difficult. The histone mark H4K20me3 is involved and caused by de novo mutations that occur in a gene that encodes lamin A. Lamin A is made but is not processed properly. This poor processing creates an abnormal nuclear morphology and disorganized heterochromatin. Patients also do not have appropriate DNA repair, and they also have increased genomic instability.

In normal conditions, the LMNA gene codes for a structural protein called prelamin A, which undergoes a series of processing steps before attaining its final form, called lamin A. Prelamin A contains a "CAAX" where C is a cysteine, A an aliphatic amino acid, and X any amino acid. This motif at the carboxyl-termini of proteins triggers three sequential enzymatic modifications. First, protein farnesyltransferase catalyzes the addition of a farnesyl moiety to the cysteine. Second, an endoprotease that recognizes the farnesylated protein catalyzes the peptide bond's cleavage between the cysteine and -aaX. In the third step, isoprenylcysteine carboxyl methyltransferase catalyzes methylation of the carboxyl-terminal farnesyl cysteine. The farnesylated and methylated protein is transported through a nuclear pore to the interior of the nucleus. Once in the nucleus, the protein is cleaved by a protease called zinc metallopeptidase STE24 (ZMPSTE24), which removes the last 15 amino acids, which includes the farnesylated cysteine. After cleavage by the protease, prelamin A is referred to as lamin A. In most mammalian cells, lamin A, along with lamin B1, lamin B2, and lamin C, makes up the nuclear lamina, which provides shape and stability to the inner nuclear envelope.
Before the late 20th century, research on progeria yielded very little information about the syndrome. In 2003, the cause of progeria was discovered to be a point mutation in position 1824 of the LMNA gene, which replaces a cytosine with thymine. This mutation creates a 5' cryptic splice site within exon 11, resulting in a shorter than normal mRNA transcript. When this shorter mRNA is translated into protein, it produces an abnormal variant of the prelamin A protein, referred to as progerin. Progerin's farnesyl group cannot be removed because the ZMPSTE24 cleavage site is lacking from progerin, so the abnormal protein is permanently attached to the nuclear rim. One result is that the nuclear lamina does not provide the nuclear envelope with enough structural support, causing it to take on an abnormal shape. Since the support that the nuclear lamina normally provides is necessary for the organizing of chromatin during mitosis, weakening of the nuclear lamina limits the ability of the cell to divide. However, defective cell division is unlikely to be the main defect leading to progeria, particularly because children develop normally without any signs of disease until about one year of age. Farnesylated prelamin A variants also lead to defective DNA repair, which may play a role in the development of progeria. Progerin expression also leads to defects in the establishment of fibroblast cell polarity, which is also seen in physiological aging.

To date over 1,400 SNPs in the LMNA gene are known. They can manifest as changes in mRNA, splicing, or protein amino acid sequence (e.g. Arg471Cys, Arg482Gln, Arg527Leu, Arg527Cys, Ala529Val).

Progerin may also play a role in normal human aging, since its production is activated in typical senescent cells.

Unlike other "accelerated aging diseases" (such as Werner syndrome, Cockayne syndrome or xeroderma pigmentosum), progeria may not be directly caused by defective DNA repair. These diseases each cause changes in a few specific aspects of aging, but never in every aspect at once, so they are often called "segmental progerias".

A 2003 report in Nature said that progeria may be a de novo dominant trait. It develops during cell division in a newly conceived zygote or in the gametes of one of the parents. It is caused by mutations in the LMNA (lamin A protein) gene on chromosome 1; the mutated form of lamin A is commonly known as progerin. One of the authors, Leslie Gordon, was a physician who did not know anything about progeria until her own son, Sam, was diagnosed at 22 months. Gordon and her husband, pediatrician Scott Berns, founded the Progeria Research Foundation.

Lamin A

Lamin A is a major component of a protein scaffold on the inner edge of the nucleus called the nuclear lamina that helps organize nuclear processes such as RNA and DNA synthesis.

Prelamin A contains a CAAX box at the C-terminus of the protein (where C is a cysteine and A is any aliphatic amino acids). This ensures that the cysteine is farnesylated and allows prelamin A to bind membranes, specifically the nuclear membrane. After prelamin A has been localized to the cell nuclear membrane, the C-terminal amino acids, including the farnesylated cysteine, are cleaved off by a specific protease. The resulting protein, now lamin A, is no longer membrane-bound and carries out functions inside the nucleus.

In HGPS, the recognition site that the enzyme requires for cleavage of prelamin A to lamin A is mutated. Lamin A cannot be produced, and prelamin A builds up on the nuclear membrane, causing a characteristic nuclear blebbing. This results in the symptoms of progeria, although the relationship between the misshapen nucleus and the symptoms is not known.

A study that compared HGPS patient cells with the skin cells from young and elderly normal human subjects found similar defects in the HGPS and elderly cells, including down-regulation of certain nuclear proteins, increased DNA damage, and demethylation of histone, leading to reduced heterochromatin. Nematodes over their lifespan show progressive lamin changes comparable to HGPS in all cells but neurons and gametes. These studies suggest that lamin A defects are associated with normal aging.

Mitochondria 
The presence of progerin also leads to the accumulation of dysfunctional mitochondria within the cell. These mitochondria are characterized by a swollen morphology, caused by a condensation of mtDNA and TFAM into the mitochondria, which is driven by a severe mitochondrial dysfunction (low mitochondrial membrane potential, low ATP production, low respiration capacity and high ROS production). Therefore, contributing substantially to the senescence phenotype. Although, the explanation for this defective-mitochondria accumulation in progeria is about to be elucidated, it has been proposed that low PGC1-α expression (important for mitochondrial biogenesis, maintenance and function) along with low LAMP2 protein level and lysosome number  (both important for mitophagy: the degradation of defective mitochondria pathway), could be implicated.

Diagnosis
Skin changes, abnormal growth, and loss of hair occur. These symptoms normally start appearing by one year of age. A genetic test for LMNA mutations can confirm the diagnosis of progeria. Prior to the advent of the genetic test, misdiagnosis was common.

Treatment
In November 2020, the U.S. Food and Drug Administration approved lonafarnib, which helps prevent buildup of defective progerin and similar proteins. A clinical trial in 2018 points to significantly lower mortality rates – treatment with lonafarnib alone compared with no treatment (3.7% vs. 33.3%) – at a median post-trial follow-up time span of 2.2 years. The drug, given orphan drug status and Pediatric Disease Priority Review Voucher, is taken twice daily in the form of capsules and may cost US$650,000 per year, making it prohibitive for the vast majority of families. It is unclear how it will be covered by health insurance in the United States. Common side effects of the drug include "nausea, vomiting, diarrhea, infections, decreased appetite, and fatigue".

Other treatment options have focused on reducing complications (such as cardiovascular disease) with coronary artery bypass surgery and low-dose acetylsalicylic acid.

Growth hormone treatment has been attempted. The use of Morpholinos has also been attempted in mice and cell cultures in order to reduce progerin production. Antisense Morpholino oligonucleotides specifically directed against the mutated exon 11–exon 12 junction in the mutated pre-mRNAs were used.

A type of anticancer drug, the farnesyltransferase inhibitors (FTIs), has been proposed, but their use has been mostly limited to animal models. A Phase II clinical trial using the FTI lonafarnib began in May 2007. In studies on the cells another anti-cancer drug, rapamycin, caused removal of progerin from the nuclear membrane through autophagy. It has been proved that pravastatin and zoledronate are effective drugs when it comes to the blocking of farnesyl group production.

Farnesyltransferase inhibitors (FTIs) are drugs that inhibit the activity of an enzyme needed to make a link between progerin proteins and farnesyl groups. This link generates the permanent attachment of the progerin to the nuclear rim. In progeria, cellular damage can occur because that attachment occurs, and the nucleus is not in a normal state. Lonafarnib is an FTI, which means it can avoid this link, so progerin can not remain attached to the nucleus rim, and it now has a more normal state.

Studies of sirolimus, an mTOR Inhibitor, demonstrate that it can minimize the phenotypic effects of progeria fibroblasts. Other observed consequences of its use are abolishing nuclear blebbing, degradation of progerin in affected cells, and reducing insoluble progerin aggregates formation. These results have been observed only in vitro and are not the results of any clinical trial, although it is believed that the treatment might benefit HGPS patients.

Recently, it has been demonstrated that the CRM1 protein (a key component of the nuclear export machinery in mammmalian) is upregulated in HGPS cells, wich drives to the abnormal localization of NES containing proteins from the nucleus to the cytoplasm. Moreover, the inhibition of CRM1 in HGPS alleviates the associated-senescence phenotype as well as the mitochondrial function (an important determinant in senescence) and lysosome content. These results are under in vivo validation with selinexor (a more suitable CRM1 inhibitor for human use).

Prognosis
As there is no known cure, few people with progeria exceed 13 years of age. At least 90 percent of patients die from complications of atherosclerosis, such as heart attack or stroke.

Mental development is not adversely affected; in fact, intelligence tends to be average to above average. With respect to the features of aging that progeria appears to manifest, the development of symptoms is comparable to aging at a rate eight to ten times faster than normal. With respect to those that progeria does not exhibit, patients show no neurodegeneration or cancer predisposition. They also do not develop conditions that are commonly associated with accumulation of damage, such as cataracts (caused by UV exposure) and osteoarthritis.

Although there may not be any successful treatments for progeria itself, there are treatments for the problems it causes, such as arthritic, respiratory, and cardiovascular problems. People with progeria have normal reproductive development, and there are known cases of women with progeria who delivered healthy offspring.

Epidemiology
A study from the Netherlands has shown an incidence of 1 in 20 million births. According to the Progeria Research Foundation, as of September 2020, there are 179 known cases in the world, in 53 countries; 18 of the cases were identified in the United States. Hundreds of cases have been reported in medical history since 1886. However, the Progeria Research Foundation believes there may be as many as 150 undiagnosed cases worldwide.

There have been only two cases in which a healthy person was known to carry the LMNA mutation that causes progeria. One family from India had four of six children with progeria.

Research

Mouse model
A mouse model of progeria exists, though in the mouse, the LMNA prelamin A is not mutated. Instead, ZMPSTE24, the specific protease that is required to remove the C-terminus of prelamin A, is missing. Both cases result in the buildup of farnesylated prelamin A on the nuclear membrane and in the characteristic nuclear LMNA blebbing.

In 2020 BASE editing was used in a mouse model to target the LMNA gene mutation that causes the progerin protein instead of the healthy Lamin A while in 2023 a study designed a peptide that prevented progerin from binding to BubR1 which is known to regulate aging in mice.

DNA repair

Repair of DNA double-strand breaks can occur by either of two processes, non-homologous end joining (NHEJ) or homologous recombination (HR).  A-type lamins promote genetic stability by maintaining levels of proteins that have key roles in NHEJ  and HR. Mouse cells deficient for maturation of prelamin A show increased DNA damage and chromosome aberrations and have increased sensitivity to DNA damaging agents. In progeria, the inability to adequately repair DNA damages due to defective A-type lamin may cause aspects of premature aging (also see DNA damage theory of aging).

Epigenetic clock analysis of human HGPS
Fibroblast samples from children with progeria syndrome exhibit accelerated epigenetic aging effects according to the epigenetic clock for skin and blood samples.

History 
Progeria was first described in 1886 by Jonathan Hutchinson. It was also described independently in 1897 by Hastings Gilford. The condition was later named Hutchinson–Gilford progeria syndrome. Scientists are interested in progeria partly because it might reveal clues about the normal process of aging.

Etymology
The word progeria comes from the Greek words "pro" (πρό), meaning "before" or "premature", and "gēras" (γῆρας), meaning "old age".

Society and culture

Notable cases
Yan Hui, a student of Confucius, aged rapidly and died at a young age, appearing as an old man by his late 20s.  He may be one of the earliest potential examples of progeria in history.

In 1987, fifteen-year-old Mickey Hays, who had progeria, appeared along with Jack Elam in the documentary I Am Not a Freak.  Elam and Hays first met during the filming of the 1986 film The Aurora Encounter, in which Hays was cast as an alien.  The friendship that developed lasted until Hays died in 1992, on his 20th birthday. Elam said, "You know I've met a lot of people, but I've never met anybody that got next to me like Mickey."

Harold Kushner, who among other things wrote the book When Bad Things Happen to Good People, had a son, Aaron, who died at the age of 14 in 1977 of progeria.

Margaret Casey, a 29-year-old progeria patient who was then believed to be the oldest survivor of the premature aging disease, died on Sunday, May 26, 1985. Casey, a freelance artist, was admitted to Yale-New Haven Hospital on the night of May 25 with respiratory problems, which caused her death.

Sam Berns was an American activist with the disease. He was the subject of the HBO documentary Life According to Sam. Berns also gave a TEDx talk titled My Philosophy for a Happy Life on December 13, 2013.

Hayley Okines was an English progeria patient who spread awareness of the condition.

Rania was a French progeria patient who died on October 16, 2020, at the age of 16. She was a popular creator on the social media platforms TikTok, Instagram and YouTube with 871,000 followers on TikTok, 700,000 on Instagram and 320,000 on YouTube.

Leon Botha, the South African painter and DJ who was known, among other things, for his work with the hip-hop duo Die Antwoord, lived with progeria. He died in 2011, aged 26.

Tiffany Wedekind of Columbus, Ohio, is believed to be the oldest survivor of progeria at 44 years old as of September 2022.

Alexandra Peraut is a Catalan girl with progeria, she has inspired the book Una nena entre vint milions ('A girl in 20 million'), a children's book to explain progeria to youngsters.

Adalia Rose Williams, born December 10, 2006, was an American girl with progeria, who was a notable YouTuber and vlogger who shared her everyday life on social media. She died on January 12, 2022, at the age of 15.

References

Sources
 

Genodermatoses
Progeroid syndromes
Rare diseases
Senescence